The Fair Barbarian is a 1917 American silent comedy film directed by Robert Thornby and written by Edith M. Kennedy, based on an 1881 novel by Frances Hodgson Burnett. The film stars Vivian Martin, Clarence Geldart, Douglas MacLean, Jane Wolfe, Josephine Crowell, and Mae Busch. The film was released on December 17, 1917, by Paramount Pictures. It is not known whether the film currently survives.

Plot
As described in a film magazine, Octavia Bassett (Martin) of Bloody Gulch, after a breakup with her sweetheart, decides to visit her Aunt Belinda (Wolfe) in Slowbridge. Her apparel and automobile shock the inhabitants of Slowbridge, and tongues are set wagging at the musicale of Lady Theobald (Crowell). Octavia matches wits with Captain Barold (Gerrald). Lady Theobald is anxious for the captain to marry her niece Lucia (Busch). However, Lucia loves Mr. Burmistone (Paget), a "common" mill owner. Just as Octavia has decided that she will marry the captain, her father and Jack Belasys (MacLean), her ex-fiancé, arrive in Slowbridge. The pleasure of seeing Jack and the knowledge that she can return to Bloody Gulch reunite Jack and Octavia.

Cast

References

External links

Burnett, Frances Hodgson (1881), A Fair Barbarian, Boston: James R. Osgood and Company, on the Internet Archive

1917 films
1910s English-language films
Silent American comedy films
1917 comedy films
Paramount Pictures films
Films based on works by Frances Hodgson Burnett
Films directed by Robert Thornby
American black-and-white films
American silent feature films
1910s American films